The Manhattan Project was a research and development undertaking during World War II that produced the first nuclear weapons. It was led by the United States with the support of the United Kingdom and Canada. From 1942 to 1946, the project was under the direction of Major General Leslie Groves of the U.S. Army Corps of Engineers. Nuclear physicist Robert Oppenheimer was the director of the Los Alamos Laboratory that designed the actual bombs. The Army component of the project was designated the Manhattan District as its first headquarters were in Manhattan; the placename gradually superseded the official codename, Development of Substitute Materials, for the entire project. Along the way, the project absorbed its earlier British counterpart, Tube Alloys. The Manhattan Project began modestly in 1939, but grew to employ more than 130,000 people and cost nearly US$2 billion (equivalent to about $ billion in ). Over 90 percent of the cost was for building factories and to produce fissile material, with less than 10 percent for development and production of the weapons. Research and production took place at more than thirty sites across the United States, the United Kingdom, and Canada.

The project led to the development of two types of atomic bombs, both developed concurrently, during the war: a relatively simple gun-type fission weapon and a more complex implosion-type nuclear weapon. The Thin Man gun-type design proved impractical to use with plutonium, so a simpler gun-type called Little Boy was developed that used uranium-235, an isotope that makes up only 0.7 percent of natural uranium. Because it is chemically identical to the most common isotope, uranium-238, and has almost the same mass, separating the two proved difficult. Three methods were employed for uranium enrichment: electromagnetic, gaseous and thermal. Scientists conducted most of this work at the Clinton Engineer Works at Oak Ridge, Tennessee.

In parallel with the work on uranium was an effort to produce plutonium, which researchers at the University of California, Berkeley, discovered in 1940. After the feasibility of the world's first artificial nuclear reactor, the Chicago Pile-1, was demonstrated in 1942 at the Metallurgical Laboratory in the University of Chicago, the project designed the X-10 Graphite Reactor at Oak Ridge and the production reactors at the Hanford Site in Washington state, in which uranium was irradiated and transmuted into plutonium. The plutonium was then chemically separated from the uranium, using the bismuth phosphate process. The Fat Man plutonium implosion-type weapon was developed in a concerted design and development effort by the Los Alamos Laboratory.

The project was also charged with gathering intelligence on the German nuclear weapon project. Through Operation Alsos, Manhattan Project personnel served in Europe, sometimes behind enemy lines, where they gathered nuclear materials and documents, and rounded up German scientists. Despite the Manhattan Project's tight security, Soviet atomic spies successfully penetrated the program. 

The first nuclear device ever detonated was an implosion-type bomb during the Trinity test, conducted at New Mexico's Alamogordo Bombing and Gunnery Range on 16 July 1945. Little Boy and Fat Man bombs were used a month later in the atomic bombings of Hiroshima and Nagasaki, respectively, with Manhattan Project personnel serving as bomb assembly technicians and weaponeers on the attack aircraft. In the immediate postwar years, the Manhattan Project conducted weapons testing at Bikini Atoll as part of Operation Crossroads, developed new weapons, promoted the development of the network of national laboratories, supported medical research into radiology and laid the foundations for the nuclear navy. It maintained control over American atomic weapons research and production until the formation of the United States Atomic Energy Commission in January 1947.

Origins 

The discovery of nuclear fission by German chemists Otto Hahn and Fritz Strassmann in 1938, and its theoretical explanation by Lise Meitner and Otto Frisch, made the development of an atomic bomb a theoretical possibility. There were fears that a German atomic bomb project would develop one first, especially among scientists who were refugees from Nazi Germany and other fascist countries. In August 1939, Hungarian-born physicists Leo Szilard and Eugene Wigner drafted the Einstein–Szilard letter, which warned of the potential development of "extremely powerful bombs of a new type". It urged the United States to take steps to acquire stockpiles of uranium ore and accelerate the research of Enrico Fermi and others into nuclear chain reactions. They had it signed by Albert Einstein and delivered to President Franklin D. Roosevelt. Roosevelt called on Lyman Briggs of the National Bureau of Standards to head the Advisory Committee on Uranium to investigate the issues raised by the letter. Briggs held a meeting on 21 October 1939, which was attended by Szilárd, Wigner and Edward Teller. The committee reported back to Roosevelt in November that uranium "would provide a possible source of bombs with a destructiveness vastly greater than anything now known."

In February 1940, the U.S. Navy awarded Columbia University $6,000 in funding, most of which Enrico Fermi and Szilard spent on purchasing graphite. A team of Columbia professors including Fermi, Szilard, Eugene T. Booth and John Dunning created the first nuclear fission reaction in the Americas, verifying the work of Hahn and Strassmann. The same team subsequently built a series of prototype nuclear reactors (or "piles" as Fermi called them) in Pupin Hall at Columbia, but were not yet able to achieve a chain reaction. The Advisory Committee on Uranium became the National Defense Research Committee (NDRC) on Uranium when that organization was formed on 27 June 1940. Briggs proposed spending $167,000 on research into uranium, particularly the uranium-235 isotope, and plutonium, which was discovered in 1940 at the University of California. On 28 June 1941, Roosevelt signed Executive Order 8807, which created the Office of Scientific Research and Development (OSRD), with Vannevar Bush as its director. The office was empowered to engage in large engineering projects in addition to research. The NDRC Committee on Uranium became the S-1 Section of the OSRD; the word "uranium" was dropped for security reasons.

In Britain, Frisch and Rudolf Peierls at the University of Birmingham had made a breakthrough investigating the critical mass of uranium-235 in June 1939. Their March 1940 Frisch–Peierls memorandum initiated the British atomic bomb project and its MAUD Committee, which unanimously recommended pursuing the development of an atomic bomb. In July 1940, Britain had offered to give the United States access to its scientific research, and the Tizard Mission's John Cockcroft briefed American scientists on British developments. He discovered that the American project was smaller than the British, and not as far advanced.

As part of the scientific exchange, the MAUD Committee's findings were conveyed to the United States. One of its members, the Australian physicist Mark Oliphant, flew to the United States in late August 1941 and discovered that data provided by the MAUD Committee had not reached key American physicists. Oliphant then set out to find out why the committee's findings were apparently being ignored. He met with the Uranium Committee and visited Berkeley, California, where he spoke persuasively to Ernest O. Lawrence. Lawrence was sufficiently impressed to commence his own research into uranium. He in turn spoke to James B. Conant, Arthur H. Compton and George B. Pegram. Oliphant's mission was therefore a success; key American physicists were now aware of the potential power of an atomic bomb.

On 9 October 1941, President Roosevelt approved the atomic program after he convened a meeting with Vannevar Bush and Vice President Henry A. Wallace. To control the program, he created a Top Policy Group consisting of himself—although he never attended a meeting—Wallace, Bush, Conant, Secretary of War Henry L. Stimson, and the Chief of Staff of the Army, General George C. Marshall. Roosevelt chose the Army to run the project rather than the Navy, because the Army had more experience with management of large-scale construction projects. He also agreed to coordinate the effort with that of the British, and on 11 October he sent a message to Prime Minister Winston Churchill, suggesting that they correspond on atomic matters.

Feasibility

Proposals 

The S-1 Committee held its meeting on 18 December 1941 "pervaded by an atmosphere of enthusiasm and urgency" in the wake of the attack on Pearl Harbor and the subsequent United States declaration of war upon Japan and then on Germany. Work was proceeding on three different techniques for isotope separation to separate uranium-235 from the more abundant uranium-238. Lawrence and his team at the University of California investigated electromagnetic separation, while Eger Murphree and Jesse Wakefield Beams's team looked into gaseous diffusion at Columbia University, and Philip Abelson directed research into thermal diffusion at the Carnegie Institution of Washington and later the Naval Research Laboratory. Murphree was also the head of an unsuccessful separation project using gas centrifuges.

Meanwhile, there were two lines of research into nuclear reactor technology, with Harold Urey continuing research into heavy water at Columbia, while Arthur Compton brought the scientists working under his supervision from Columbia, California and Princeton University to join his team at the University of Chicago, where he organized the Metallurgical Laboratory in early 1942 to study plutonium and reactors using graphite as a neutron moderator. Briggs, Compton, Lawrence, Murphree, and Urey met on 23 May 1942, to finalize the S-1 Committee recommendations, which called for all five technologies to be pursued. This was approved by Bush, Conant, and Brigadier General Wilhelm D. Styer, the chief of staff of Major General Brehon B. Somervell's Services of Supply, who had been designated the Army's representative on nuclear matters. Bush and Conant then took the recommendation to the Top Policy Group with a budget proposal for $54 million for construction by the United States Army Corps of Engineers, $31 million for research and development by OSRD and $5 million for contingencies in fiscal year 1943. The Top Policy Group in turn sent it on 17 June 1942, to the President, who approved it by writing "OK FDR" on the document.

Bomb design concepts 

Compton asked theoretical physicist J. Robert Oppenheimer of the University of California to take over research into fast neutron calculations—the key to calculations of critical mass and weapon detonation—from Gregory Breit, who had quit on 18 May 1942 because of concerns over lax operational security. John H. Manley, a physicist at the Metallurgical Laboratory, was assigned to assist Oppenheimer by contacting and coordinating experimental physics groups scattered across the country. Oppenheimer and Robert Serber of the University of Illinois examined the problems of neutron diffusion—how neutrons moved in a nuclear chain reaction—and hydrodynamics—how the explosion produced by a chain reaction might behave. To review this work and the general theory of fission reactions, Oppenheimer and Fermi convened meetings at the University of Chicago in June and at the University of California in July 1942 with theoretical physicists Hans Bethe, John Van Vleck, Edward Teller, Emil Konopinski, Robert Serber, Stan Frankel, and Eldred C. (Carlyle) Nelson, the latter three former students of Oppenheimer, and experimental physicists Emilio Segrè, Felix Bloch, Franco Rasetti, John Henry Manley, and Edwin McMillan. They tentatively confirmed that a fission bomb was theoretically possible.

There were still many unknown factors. The properties of pure uranium-235 were relatively unknown, as were those of plutonium, an element that had only been discovered in February 1941 by Glenn Seaborg and his team. The scientists at the (July 1942) Berkeley conference envisioned creating plutonium in nuclear reactors where uranium-238 atoms absorbed neutrons that had been emitted from fissioning uranium-235 atoms. At this point no reactor had been built, and only tiny quantities of plutonium were available from cyclotrons at institutions such as Washington University in St. Louis. Even by December 1943, only two milligrams had been produced. There were many ways of arranging the fissile material into a critical mass. The simplest was shooting a "cylindrical plug" into a sphere of "active material" with a "tamper"—dense material that would focus neutrons inward and keep the reacting mass together to increase its efficiency. They also explored designs involving spheroids, a primitive form of "implosion" suggested by Richard C. Tolman, and the possibility of autocatalytic methods, which would increase the efficiency of the bomb as it exploded.

Considering the idea of the fission bomb theoretically settled—at least until more experimental data was available—the 1942 Berkeley conference then turned in a different direction. Edward Teller pushed for discussion of a more powerful bomb: the "super", now usually referred to as a "hydrogen bomb", which would use the explosive force of a detonating fission bomb to ignite a nuclear fusion reaction in deuterium and tritium. Teller proposed scheme after scheme, but Bethe refused each one. The fusion idea was put aside to concentrate on producing fission bombs. Teller also raised the speculative possibility that an atomic bomb might "ignite" the atmosphere because of a hypothetical fusion reaction of nitrogen nuclei. Bethe calculated that it could not happen, and a report co-authored by Teller showed that "no self-propagating chain of nuclear reactions is likely to be started." In Serber's account, Oppenheimer mentioned the possibility of this scenario to Arthur Compton, who "didn't have enough sense to shut up about it. It somehow got into a document that went to Washington" and was "never laid to rest".

Organization

Manhattan District 
The Chief of Engineers, Major General Eugene Reybold, selected Colonel James C. Marshall to head the Army's part of the project in June 1942. Marshall created a liaison office in Washington, D.C., but established his temporary headquarters on the 18th floor of 270 Broadway in New York, where he could draw on administrative support from the Corps of Engineers' North Atlantic Division. It was close to the Manhattan office of Stone & Webster, the principal project contractor, and to Columbia University. He had permission to draw on his former command, the Syracuse District, for staff, and he started with Lieutenant Colonel Kenneth Nichols, who became his deputy.

Because most of his task involved construction, Marshall worked in cooperation with the head of the Corps of Engineers Construction Division, Major General Thomas M. Robbins, and his deputy, Colonel Leslie Groves. Reybold, Somervell, and Styer decided to call the project "Development of Substitute Materials", but Groves felt that this would draw attention. Since engineer districts normally carried the name of the city where they were located, Marshall and Groves agreed to name the Army's component of the project the Manhattan District. This became official on 13 August when Reybold issued the order creating the new district. Informally, it was known as the Manhattan Engineer District, or MED. Unlike other districts, it had no geographic boundaries, and Marshall had the authority of a division engineer. Development of Substitute Materials remained as the official codename of the project as a whole, but was supplanted over time by "Manhattan".

Marshall later conceded that, "I had never heard of atomic fission but I did know that you could not build much of a plant, much less four of them for $90 million." A single TNT plant that Nichols had recently built in Pennsylvania had cost $128 million. Nor were they impressed with estimates to the nearest order of magnitude, which Groves compared with telling a caterer to prepare for between ten and a thousand guests. A survey team from Stone & Webster had already scouted a site for the production plants. The War Production Board recommended sites around Knoxville, Tennessee, an isolated area where the Tennessee Valley Authority could supply ample electric power and the rivers could provide cooling water for the reactors. After examining several sites, the survey team selected one near Elza, Tennessee. Conant advised that it be acquired at once and Styer agreed but Marshall temporized, awaiting the results of Conant's reactor experiments before taking action. Of the prospective processes, only Lawrence's electromagnetic separation appeared sufficiently advanced for construction to commence.

Marshall and Nichols began assembling the resources they would need. The first step was to obtain a high priority rating for the project. The top ratings were AA-1 through AA-4 in descending order, although there was also a special AAA rating reserved for emergencies. Ratings AA-1 and AA-2 were for essential weapons and equipment, so Colonel Lucius D. Clay, the deputy chief of staff at Services and Supply for requirements and resources, felt that the highest rating he could assign was AA-3, although he was willing to provide a AAA rating on request for critical materials if the need arose. Nichols and Marshall were disappointed; AA-3 was the same priority as Nichols' TNT plant in Pennsylvania.

Military Policy Committee 

Vannevar Bush became dissatisfied with Colonel Marshall's failure to get the project moving forward expeditiously, specifically the failure to acquire the Tennessee site, the low priority allocated to the project by the Army and the location of his headquarters in New York City. Bush felt that more aggressive leadership was required, and spoke to Harvey Bundy and Generals Marshall, Somervell, and Styer about his concerns. He wanted the project placed under a senior policy committee, with a prestigious officer, preferably Styer, as overall director.

Somervell and Styer selected Groves for the post, informing him on 17 September of this decision, and that General Marshall ordered that he be promoted to brigadier general, as it was felt that the title "general" would hold more sway with the academic scientists working on the Manhattan Project. Groves' orders placed him directly under Somervell rather than Reybold, with Colonel Marshall now answerable to Groves. Groves established his headquarters in Washington, D.C., on the fifth floor of the New War Department Building, where Colonel Marshall had his liaison office. He assumed command of the Manhattan Project on 23 September 1942. Later that day, he attended a meeting called by Stimson, which established a Military Policy Committee, responsible to the Top Policy Group, consisting of Bush (with Conant as an alternate), Styer and Rear Admiral William R. Purnell. Tolman and Conant were later appointed as Groves' scientific advisers.

On 19 September, Groves went to Donald Nelson, the chairman of the War Production Board, and asked for broad authority to issue a AAA rating whenever it was required. Nelson initially balked but quickly caved in when Groves threatened to go to the President. Groves promised not to use the AAA rating unless it was necessary. It soon transpired that for the routine requirements of the project the AAA rating was too high but the AA-3 rating was too low. After a long campaign, Groves finally received AA-1 authority on 1 July 1944. According to Groves, "In Washington you became aware of the importance of top priority. Most everything proposed in the Roosevelt administration would have top priority. That would last for about a week or two and then something else would get top priority".

One of Groves' early problems was to find a director for Project Y, the group that would design and build the bomb. The obvious choice was one of the three laboratory heads, Urey, Lawrence, or Compton, but they could not be spared. Compton recommended Oppenheimer, who was already intimately familiar with the bomb design concepts. However, Oppenheimer had little administrative experience, and, unlike Urey, Lawrence, and Compton, had not won a Nobel Prize, which many scientists felt that the head of such an important laboratory should have. There were also concerns about Oppenheimer's security status, as many of his associates were communists, including his wife, Kitty (Katherine Oppenheimer); his girlfriend, Jean Tatlock; and his brother, Frank Oppenheimer. A long conversation on a train in October 1942 convinced Groves and Nichols that Oppenheimer thoroughly understood the issues involved in setting up a laboratory in a remote area and should be appointed as its director. Groves personally waived the security requirements and issued Oppenheimer a clearance on 20 July 1943.

Collaboration with the United Kingdom 

The British and Americans exchanged nuclear information but did not initially combine their efforts. Britain rebuffed attempts by Bush and Conant in 1941 to strengthen cooperation with its own project, codenamed Tube Alloys, because it was reluctant to share its technological lead and help the United States develop its own atomic bomb. An American scientist who brought a personal letter from Roosevelt to Churchill offering to pay for all research and development in an Anglo-American project was poorly treated, and Churchill did not reply to the letter. The United States as a result decided as early as April 1942 that if its offer was rejected, they should proceed alone. The British, who had made significant contributions early in the war, did not have the resources to carry through such a research program while fighting for their survival. As a result, Tube Alloys soon fell behind its American counterpart. and on 30 July 1942, Sir John Anderson, the minister responsible for Tube Alloys, advised Churchill that: "We must face the fact that ... [our] pioneering work ... is a dwindling asset and that, unless we capitalise it quickly, we shall be outstripped. We now have a real contribution to make to a 'merger.' Soon we shall have little or none." That month Churchill and Roosevelt made an informal, unwritten agreement for atomic collaboration.

The opportunity for an equal partnership no longer existed, however, as shown in August 1942 when the British unsuccessfully demanded substantial control over the project while paying none of the costs. By 1943 the roles of the two countries had reversed from late 1941; in January Conant notified the British that they would no longer receive atomic information except in certain areas. While the British were shocked by the abrogation of the Churchill-Roosevelt agreement, head of the Canadian National Research Council C. J. Mackenzie was less surprised, writing "I can't help feeling that the United Kingdom group [over] emphasizes the importance of their contribution as compared with the Americans." As Conant and Bush told the British, the order came "from the top".

The British bargaining position had worsened; the American scientists had decided that the United States no longer needed outside help, and they wanted to prevent Britain exploiting post-war commercial applications of atomic energy. The committee supported, and Roosevelt agreed to, restricting the flow of information to what Britain could use during the war—especially not bomb design—even if doing so slowed down the American project. By early 1943 the British stopped sending research and scientists to America, and as a result the Americans stopped all information sharing. The British considered ending the supply of Canadian uranium and heavy water to force the Americans to again share, but Canada needed American supplies to produce them. They investigated the possibility of an independent nuclear program, but determined that it could not be ready in time to affect the outcome of the war in Europe.

By March 1943 Conant decided that British help would benefit some areas of the project. James Chadwick and one or two other British scientists were important enough that the bomb design team at Los Alamos needed them, despite the risk of revealing weapon design secrets. In August 1943 Churchill and Roosevelt negotiated the Quebec Agreement, which resulted in a resumption of cooperation between scientists working on the same problem. Britain, however, agreed to restrictions on data on the building of large-scale production plants necessary for the bomb. The subsequent Hyde Park Agreement in September 1944 extended this cooperation to the postwar period. The Quebec Agreement established the Combined Policy Committee to coordinate the efforts of the United States, United Kingdom and Canada. Stimson, Bush and Conant served as the American members of the Combined Policy Committee, Field Marshal Sir John Dill and Colonel J. J. Llewellin were the British members, and C. D. Howe was the Canadian member. Llewellin returned to the United Kingdom at the end of 1943 and was replaced on the committee by Sir Ronald Ian Campbell, who in turn was replaced by the British Ambassador to the United States, Lord Halifax, in early 1945. Sir John Dill died in Washington, D.C., in November 1944 and was replaced both as Chief of the British Joint Staff Mission and as a member of the Combined Policy Committee by Field Marshal Sir Henry Maitland Wilson.

When cooperation resumed after the Quebec agreement, the Americans' progress and expenditures amazed the British. The United States had already spent more than $1 billion ($ billion today), while in 1943, the United Kingdom had spent about £0.5 million. Chadwick thus pressed for British involvement in the Manhattan Project to the fullest extent and abandoned any hopes of an independent British project during the war. With Churchill's backing, he attempted to ensure that every request from Groves for assistance was honored. The British Mission that arrived in the United States in December 1943 included Niels Bohr, Otto Frisch, Klaus Fuchs, Rudolf Peierls, and Ernest Titterton. More scientists arrived in early 1944. While those assigned to gaseous diffusion left by the fall of 1944, the 35 working under Oliphant with Lawrence at Berkeley were assigned to existing laboratory groups and most stayed until the end of the war. The 19 sent to Los Alamos also joined existing groups, primarily related to implosion and bomb assembly, but not the plutonium-related ones. Part of the Quebec Agreement specified that nuclear weapons would not be used against another country without the mutual consent of the US and UK. In June 1945, Wilson agreed that the use of nuclear weapons against Japan would be recorded as a decision of the Combined Policy Committee.

The Combined Policy Committee created the Combined Development Trust in June 1944, with Groves as its chairman, to procure uranium and thorium ores on international markets. The Belgian Congo and Canada held much of the world's uranium outside Eastern Europe, and the Belgian government in exile was in London. Britain agreed to give the United States most of the Belgian ore, as it could not use most of the supply without restricted American research. In 1944, the Trust purchased  of uranium oxide ore from companies operating mines in the Belgian Congo. In order to avoid briefing US Secretary of the Treasury Henry Morgenthau Jr. on the project, a special account not subject to the usual auditing and controls was used to hold Trust monies. Between 1944 and the time he resigned from the Trust in 1947, Groves deposited a total of $37.5 million into the Trust's account.

Groves appreciated the early British atomic research and the British scientists' contributions to the Manhattan Project, but stated that the United States would have succeeded without them. He also said that Churchill was "the best friend the atomic bomb project had [as] he kept Roosevelt's interest up ... He just stirred him up all the time by telling him how important he thought the project was."

The British wartime participation was crucial to the success of the United Kingdom's independent nuclear weapons program after the war when the McMahon Act of 1946 temporarily ended American nuclear cooperation.

Project sites

Oak Ridge 

The day after he took over the project, Groves took a train to Tennessee with Colonel Marshall to inspect the proposed site there, and Groves was impressed. On 29 September 1942, United States Under Secretary of War Robert P. Patterson authorized the Corps of Engineers to acquire  of land by eminent domain at a cost of $3.5 million. An additional  was subsequently acquired. About 1,000 families were affected by the condemnation order, which came into effect on 7 October. Protests, legal appeals, and a 1943 Congressional inquiry were to no avail. By mid-November U.S. Marshals were tacking notices to vacate on farmhouse doors, and construction contractors were moving in. Some families were given two weeks' notice to vacate farms that had been their homes for generations; others had settled there after being evicted to make way for the Great Smoky Mountains National Park in the 1920s or the Norris Dam in the 1930s. The ultimate cost of land acquisition in the area, which was not completed until March 1945, was only about $2.6 million, which worked out to around $47 an acre. When presented with Public Proclamation Number Two, which declared Oak Ridge a total exclusion area that no one could enter without military permission, the Governor of Tennessee, Prentice Cooper, angrily tore it up.

Initially known as the Kingston Demolition Range, the site was officially renamed the Clinton Engineer Works (CEW) in early 1943. While Stone & Webster concentrated on the production facilities, the architectural and engineering firm Skidmore, Owings & Merrill designed and built a residential community for 13,000. The community was located on the slopes of Black Oak Ridge, from which the new town of Oak Ridge got its name. The Army presence at Oak Ridge increased in August 1943 when Nichols replaced Marshall as head of the Manhattan Engineer District. One of his first tasks was to move the district headquarters to Oak Ridge although the name of the district did not change. In September 1943 the administration of community facilities was outsourced to Turner Construction Company through a subsidiary, the Roane-Anderson Company (for Roane and Anderson Counties, in which Oak Ridge was located). Chemical engineers, including William J. (Jenkins) Wilcox Jr. (1923–2013) and Warren Fuchs, were part of "frantic efforts" to make 10% to 12% enriched uranium 235, known as the code name "tuballoy tetroxide", with tight security and fast approvals for supplies and materials. The population of Oak Ridge soon expanded well beyond the initial plans, and peaked at 75,000 in May 1945, by which time 82,000 people were employed at the Clinton Engineer Works, and 10,000 by Roane-Anderson.

Fine-arts photographer, Josephine Herrick, and her colleague, Mary Steers, helped document the work at Oak Ridge.

Los Alamos 

The idea of locating Project Y at Oak Ridge was considered, but in the end it was decided that it should be in a remote location. On Oppenheimer's recommendation, the search for a suitable site was narrowed to the vicinity of Albuquerque, New Mexico, where Oppenheimer owned a ranch. In October 1942, Major John H. Dudley of the Manhattan District was sent to survey the area. He recommended a site near Jemez Springs, New Mexico. On 16 November, Oppenheimer, Groves, Dudley and others toured the site. Oppenheimer feared that the high cliffs surrounding the site would make his people feel claustrophobic, while the engineers were concerned with the possibility of flooding. The party then moved on to the vicinity of the Los Alamos Ranch School. Oppenheimer was impressed and expressed a strong preference for the site, citing its natural beauty and views of the Sangre de Cristo Mountains, which, it was hoped, would inspire those who would work on the project. The engineers were concerned about the poor access road, and whether the water supply would be adequate, but otherwise felt that it was ideal.

Construction was contracted to the M. M. Sundt Company of Tucson, Arizona, with Willard C. Kruger and Associates of Santa Fe, New Mexico, as architect and engineer. Work commenced in December 1942. Groves initially allocated $300,000 for construction, three times Oppenheimer's estimate, with a planned completion date of 15 March 1943. It soon became clear that the scope of Project Y was greater than expected, and by the time Sundt finished on 30 November 1943, over $7 million had been spent.

Because it was secret, Los Alamos was referred to as "Site Y" or "the Hill". Birth certificates of babies born in Los Alamos during the war listed their place of birth as PO Box 1663 in Santa Fe. Initially Los Alamos was to have been a military laboratory with Oppenheimer and other researchers commissioned into the Army. Oppenheimer went so far as to order himself a lieutenant colonel's uniform, but two key physicists, Robert Bacher and Isidor Rabi, balked at the idea. Conant, Groves and Oppenheimer then devised a compromise whereby the laboratory was operated by the University of California under contract to the War Department.

Chicago 

An Army-OSRD council on 25 June 1942 decided to build a pilot plant for plutonium production in Red Gate Woods southwest of Chicago. It soon became apparent that the scale of operations was too great for the area, and it was decided to build the plant at Oak Ridge, and keep a research and testing facility in Chicago.

Delays in establishing the plant in Red Gate Woods led Compton to authorize the Metallurgical Laboratory to construct the first nuclear reactor beneath the bleachers of Stagg Field at the University of Chicago. The reactor required an enormous amount of graphite blocks and uranium pellets. At the time, there was a limited source of pure uranium. Frank Spedding of Iowa State University was able to produce only two short tons of pure uranium. Additional three short tons of uranium metal was supplied by Westinghouse Lamp Plant which was produced in a rush with makeshift process. A large square balloon was constructed by Goodyear Tire to encase the reactor. On 2 December 1942, a team led by Enrico Fermi initiated the first artificial self-sustaining nuclear chain reaction in an experimental reactor known as Chicago Pile-1. The point at which a reaction becomes self-sustaining became known as "going critical". Compton reported the success to Conant in Washington, D.C., by a coded phone call, saying, "The Italian navigator [Fermi] has just landed in the new world."

In January 1943, Grafton's successor, Major Arthur V. Peterson, ordered Chicago Pile-1 dismantled and reassembled at Red Gate Woods, as he regarded the operation of a reactor as too hazardous for a densely populated area. At the Argonne site, Chicago Pile-3, the first heavy water reactor, went critical on 15 May 1944.

Hanford 

By December 1942 there were concerns that even Oak Ridge was too close to a major population center (Knoxville) in the unlikely event of a major nuclear accident. Groves recruited DuPont in November 1942 to be the prime contractor for the construction of the plutonium production complex. DuPont was offered a standard cost plus fixed-fee contract, but the President of the company, Walter S. Carpenter, Jr., wanted no profit of any kind, and asked for the proposed contract to be amended to explicitly exclude the company from acquiring any patent rights. This was accepted, but for legal reasons a nominal fee of one dollar was agreed upon. After the war, DuPont asked to be released from the contract early, and had to return 33 cents.

DuPont recommended that the site be located far from the existing uranium production facility at Oak Ridge. In December 1942, Groves dispatched Colonel Franklin Matthias and DuPont engineers to scout potential sites. Matthias reported that Hanford Site near Richland, Washington, was "ideal in virtually all respects". It was isolated and near the Columbia River, which could supply sufficient water to cool the reactors that would produce the plutonium. Groves visited the site in January and established the Hanford Engineer Works (HEW), codenamed "Site W".

The federal government relocated some 1,500 residents of White Bluffs and Hanford, and nearby settlements, as well as the Wanapum and other tribes using the area. A dispute arose with farmers over compensation for crops, which had already been planted before the land was acquired. Where schedules allowed, the Army allowed the crops to be harvested, but this was not always possible. The land acquisition process dragged on and was not completed before the end of the Manhattan Project in December 1946.

The dispute did not delay work. Although progress on the reactor design at Metallurgical Laboratory and DuPont was not sufficiently advanced to accurately predict the scope of the project, a start was made in April 1943 on facilities for an estimated 25,000 workers, half of whom were expected to live on-site. By July 1944, some 1,200 buildings had been erected and nearly 51,000 people were living in the construction camp. As area engineer, Matthias exercised overall control of the site. At its peak, the construction camp was the third most populous town in Washington state. Hanford operated a fleet of over 900 buses, more than the city of Chicago. Like Los Alamos and Oak Ridge, Richland was a gated community with restricted access, but it looked more like a typical wartime American boomtown: the military profile was lower, and physical security elements like high fences, towers, and guard dogs were less evident.

Canadian sites

British Columbia 
Cominco had produced electrolytic hydrogen at Trail, British Columbia, since 1930. Urey suggested in 1941 that it could produce heavy water. To the existing $10 million plant consisting of 3,215 cells consuming 75 MW of hydroelectric power, secondary electrolysis cells were added to increase the deuterium concentration in the water from 2.3% to 99.8%. For this process, Hugh Taylor of Princeton developed a platinum-on-carbon catalyst for the first three stages while Urey developed a nickel-chromia one for the fourth stage tower. The final cost was $2.8 million. The Canadian Government did not officially learn of the project until August 1942. Trail's heavy water production started in January 1944 and continued until 1956. Heavy water from Trail was used for Chicago Pile 3, the first reactor using heavy water and natural uranium, which went critical on 15 May 1944.

Ontario 
The Chalk River, Ontario, site was established to rehouse the Allied effort at the Montreal Laboratory away from an urban area. A new community was built at Deep River, Ontario, to provide residences and facilities for the team members. The site was chosen for its proximity to the industrial manufacturing area of Ontario and Quebec, and proximity to a rail head adjacent to a large military base, Camp Petawawa. Located on the Ottawa River, it had access to abundant water. The first director of the new laboratory was Hans von Halban. He was replaced by John Cockcroft in May 1944, who in turn was succeeded by Bennett Lewis in September 1946. A pilot reactor known as ZEEP (zero-energy experimental pile) became the first Canadian reactor, and the first to be completed outside the United States, when it went critical in September 1945, ZEEP remained in use by researchers until 1970. A larger 10 MW NRX reactor, which was designed during the war, was completed and went critical in July 1947.

Northwest Territories 
The Eldorado Mine at Port Radium was a source of uranium ore.

Heavy water sites 

Although DuPont's preferred designs for the nuclear reactors were helium cooled and used graphite as a moderator, DuPont still expressed an interest in using heavy water as a backup, in case the graphite reactor design proved infeasible for some reason. For this purpose, it was estimated that  of heavy water would be required per month. The P-9 Project was the government's code name for the heavy water production program. Groves therefore authorized DuPont to establish heavy water facilities at the Morgantown Ordnance Works, near Morgantown, West Virginia; at the Wabash River Ordnance Works, near Dana and Newport, Indiana; and at the Alabama Ordnance Works, near Childersburg and Sylacauga, Alabama. Although known as Ordnance Works and paid for under Ordnance Department contracts, they were built and operated by the Army Corps of Engineers. The American plants used a process different from Trail's; heavy water was extracted by distillation, taking advantage of the slightly higher boiling point of heavy water.

Uranium

Ore 

The key raw material for the project was uranium, which was used as fuel for the reactors, as feed that was transformed into plutonium, and, in its enriched form, in the atomic bomb itself. There were four known major deposits of uranium in 1940: in Colorado, in northern Canada, in Joachimsthal in Czechoslovakia, and in the Belgian Congo. All but Joachimstal were in Allied hands. A November 1942 survey determined that sufficient quantities of uranium were available to satisfy the project's requirements. He negotiated with Eldorado Gold Mines for the purchase of ore from its refinery in Port Hope, Ontario, and its shipment in 100-ton lots. The Canadian government subsequently bought up the company's stock until it acquired a controlling interest.

While these purchases assured a sufficient supply to meet wartime needs, the American and British leaders concluded that it was in their countries' interest to gain control of as much of the world's uranium deposits as possible. The richest source of ore was the Shinkolobwe mine in the Belgian Congo, but it was flooded and closed. Nichols unsuccessfully attempted to negotiate its reopening and the sale of the entire future output to the United States with Edgar Sengier, the director of the company that owned the mine, the Union Minière du Haut-Katanga. The matter was then taken up by the Combined Policy Committee. As 30 percent of Union Minière's stock was controlled by British interests, the British took the lead in negotiations. To avoid dependence on the British and Canadians for ore, Groves also arranged for the purchase of US Vanadium Corporation's stockpile in Uravan, Colorado.

Mallinckrodt Incorporated in St. Louis, Missouri, took the raw ore and dissolved it in nitric acid to produce uranyl nitrate. Ether was then added in a liquid–liquid extraction process to separate the impurities from the uranyl nitrate. This was then heated to form uranium trioxide, which was reduced to highly pure uranium dioxide. By July 1942, Mallinckrodt was producing a ton of highly pure oxide a day, but turning this into uranium metal initially proved more difficult for contractors Westinghouse and Metal Hydrides. Production was too slow and quality was unacceptably low. A special branch of the Metallurgical Laboratory was established at Iowa State College in Ames, Iowa, under Frank Spedding to investigate alternatives. This became known as the Ames Project, and its Ames process became available in 1943.

Isotope separation 
Natural uranium consists of 99.3% uranium-238 and 0.7% uranium-235, but only the latter is fissile. The chemically identical uranium-235 has to be physically separated from the more plentiful isotope. Various methods were considered for uranium enrichment, most of which was carried out at Oak Ridge.

The most obvious technology, the centrifuge, failed, but electromagnetic separation, gaseous diffusion, and thermal diffusion technologies were all successful and contributed to the project. In February 1943, Groves came up with the idea of using the output of some plants as the input for others.

Centrifuges 
The centrifuge process was regarded as the only promising separation method in April 1942. Jesse Beams had developed such a process at the University of Virginia during the 1930s, but had encountered technical difficulties. The process required high rotational speeds, but at certain speeds harmonic vibrations developed that threatened to tear the machinery apart. It was therefore necessary to accelerate quickly through these speeds. In 1941 he began working with uranium hexafluoride, the only known gaseous compound of uranium, and was able to separate uranium-235. At Columbia, Urey had Karl P. Cohen investigate the process, and he produced a body of mathematical theory making it possible to design a centrifugal separation unit, which Westinghouse undertook to construct.

Scaling this up to a production plant presented a formidable technical challenge. Urey and Cohen estimated that producing a kilogram (2.2 lb) of uranium-235 per day would require up to 50,000 centrifuges with  rotors, or 10,000 centrifuges with  rotors, assuming that 4-meter rotors could be built. The prospect of keeping so many rotors operating continuously at high speed appeared daunting, and when Beams ran his experimental apparatus, he obtained only 60% of the predicted yield, indicating that more centrifuges would be required. Beams, Urey and Cohen then began work on a series of improvements which promised to increase the efficiency of the process. However, frequent failures of motors, shafts and bearings at high speeds delayed work on the pilot plant. In November 1942 the centrifuge process was abandoned by the Military Policy Committee following a recommendation by Conant, Nichols and August C. Klein of Stone & Webster.

Although the centrifuge method was abandoned by the Manhattan Project, research into it advanced significantly after the war with the introduction of the Zippe-type centrifuge, which was developed in the Soviet Union by Soviet and captured German engineers. It eventually became the preferred method of Uranium isotope separation, being far more economical than the other separation methods used during World War II.

Electromagnetic separation 

Electromagnetic isotope separation was developed by Lawrence at the University of California Radiation Laboratory. This method employed devices known as calutrons, a hybrid of the standard laboratory mass spectrometer and the cyclotron magnet. The name was derived from the words California, university and cyclotron. In the electromagnetic process, a magnetic field deflected charged particles according to mass. The process was neither scientifically elegant nor industrially efficient. Compared with a gaseous diffusion plant or a nuclear reactor, an electromagnetic separation plant would consume more scarce materials, require more manpower to operate, and cost more to build. Nonetheless, the process was approved because it was based on proven technology and therefore represented less risk. Moreover, it could be built in stages, and rapidly reach industrial capacity.

Marshall and Nichols discovered that the electromagnetic isotope separation process would require  of copper, which was in desperately short supply. However, silver could be substituted, in an 11:10 ratio. On 3 August 1942, Nichols met with Under Secretary of the Treasury Daniel W. Bell and asked for the transfer of 6,000 tons of silver bullion from the West Point Bullion Depository. "Young man," Bell told him, "you may think of silver in tons but the Treasury will always think of silver in troy ounces!" Ultimately  were used.

These were wound onto magnetic coils by Allis-Chalmers in Milwaukee, Wisconsin. After the war, all the machinery was dismantled and cleaned and the floorboards beneath the machinery were ripped up and burned to recover minute amounts of silver. In the end, only 1/3,600,000th was lost. The last silver was returned in May 1970.

Responsibility for the design and construction of the electromagnetic separation plant, which came to be called Y-12, was assigned to Stone & Webster by the S-1 Committee in June 1942. The design called for five first-stage processing units, known as Alpha racetracks, and two units for final processing, known as Beta racetracks. In September 1943 Groves authorized construction of four more racetracks, known as Alpha II. Construction began in February 1943.

When the plant was started up for testing on schedule in October, the 14-ton vacuum tanks crept out of alignment because of the power of the magnets, and had to be fastened more securely. A more serious problem arose when the magnetic coils started shorting out. In December Groves ordered a magnet to be broken open, and handfuls of rust were found inside. Groves then ordered the racetracks to be torn down and the magnets sent back to the factory to be cleaned. A pickling plant was established on-site to clean the pipes and fittings. The second Alpha I was not operational until the end of January 1944, the first Beta and first and third Alpha I's came online in March, and the fourth Alpha I was operational in April. The four Alpha II racetracks were completed between July and October 1944.

Tennessee Eastman was contracted to manage Y-12 on the usual cost plus fixed-fee basis, with a fee of $22,500 per month plus $7,500 per racetrack for the first seven racetracks and $4,000 per additional racetrack. The calutrons were initially operated by scientists from Berkeley to remove bugs and achieve a reasonable operating rate. They were then turned over to trained Tennessee Eastman operators who had only a high school education. Nichols compared unit production data, and pointed out to Lawrence that the young "hillbilly" girl operators, known as Calutron Girls, were outperforming his PhDs. They agreed to a production race and Lawrence lost, a morale boost for the Tennessee Eastman workers and supervisors. The girls were "trained like soldiers not to reason why", while "the scientists could not refrain from time-consuming investigation of the cause of even minor fluctuations of the dials."

Y-12 initially enriched the uranium-235 content to between 13% and 15%, and shipped the first few hundred grams of this to Los Alamos in March 1944. Only 1 part in 5,825 of the uranium feed emerged as final product. Much of the rest was splattered over equipment in the process. Strenuous recovery efforts helped raise production to 10% of the uranium-235 feed by January 1945. In February the Alpha racetracks began receiving slightly enriched (1.4%) feed from the new S-50 thermal diffusion plant. The next month it received enhanced (5%) feed from the K-25 gaseous diffusion plant. By August K-25 was producing uranium sufficiently enriched to feed directly into the Beta tracks.

Gaseous diffusion 

The most promising but also the most challenging method of isotope separation was gaseous diffusion. Graham's law states that the rate of effusion of a gas is inversely proportional to the square root of its molecular mass, so in a box containing a semi-permeable membrane and a mixture of two gases, the lighter molecules will pass out of the container more rapidly than the heavier molecules. The gas leaving the container is somewhat enriched in the lighter molecules, while the residual gas is somewhat depleted. The idea was that such boxes could be formed into a cascade of pumps and membranes, with each successive stage containing a slightly more enriched mixture. Research into the process was carried out at Columbia University by a group that included Harold Urey, Karl P. Cohen, and John R. Dunning.

In November 1942 the Military Policy Committee approved the construction of a 600-stage gaseous diffusion plant. On 14 December, M. W. Kellogg accepted an offer to construct the plant, which was codenamed K-25. A cost plus fixed-fee contract was negotiated, eventually totaling $2.5 million. A separate corporate entity called Kellex was created for the project, headed by Percival C. Keith, one of Kellogg's vice presidents. The process faced formidable technical difficulties. The highly corrosive gas uranium hexafluoride would have to be used, as no substitute could be found, and the motors and pumps would have to be vacuum tight and enclosed in inert gas. The biggest problem was the design of the barrier, which would have to be strong, porous and resistant to corrosion by uranium hexafluoride. The best choice for this seemed to be nickel. Edward Adler and Edward Norris created a mesh barrier from electroplated nickel. A six-stage pilot plant was built at Columbia to test the process, but the Norris-Adler prototype proved to be too brittle. A rival barrier was developed from powdered nickel by Kellex, the Bell Telephone Laboratories and the Bakelite Corporation. In January 1944, Groves ordered the Kellex barrier into production.

These were divided into nine sections. Within these were cells of six stages. The cells could be operated independently, or consecutively within a section. Similarly, the sections could be operated separately or as part of a single cascade. A survey party began construction by marking out the  site in May 1943. Work on the main building began in October 1943, and the six-stage pilot plant was ready for operation on 17 April 1944. In 1945 Groves canceled the upper stages of the plant, directing Kellex to instead design and build a 540-stage side feed unit, which became known as K-27. Kellex transferred the last unit to the operating contractor, Union Carbide and Carbon, on 11 September 1945. The total cost, including the K-27 plant completed after the war, came to $480 million.

The production plant commenced operation in February 1945, and as cascade after cascade came online, the quality of the product increased. By April 1945, K-25 had attained a 1.1% enrichment and the output of the S-50 thermal diffusion plant began being used as feed. Some product produced the next month reached nearly 7% enrichment. In August, the last of the 2,892 stages commenced operation. K-25 and K-27 achieved their full potential in the early postwar period, when they eclipsed the other production plants and became the prototypes for a new generation of plants.

Thermal diffusion 

The thermal diffusion process was based on Sydney Chapman and David Enskog's theory, which explained that when a mixed gas passes through a temperature gradient, the heavier one tends to concentrate at the cold end and the lighter one at the warm end. Since hot gases tend to rise and cool ones tend to fall, this can be used as a means of isotope separation. This process was first demonstrated by Klaus Clusius and Gerhard Dickel in Germany in 1938. It was developed by US Navy scientists, but was not one of the enrichment technologies initially selected for use in the Manhattan Project. This was primarily due to doubts about its technical feasibility, but the inter-service rivalry between the Army and Navy also played a part.

The Naval Research Laboratory continued the research under Philip Abelson's direction, but there was little contact with the Manhattan Project until April 1944, when Captain William S. Parsons, the naval officer in charge of ordnance development at Los Alamos, brought Oppenheimer news of encouraging progress in the Navy's experiments on thermal diffusion. Oppenheimer wrote to Groves suggesting that the output of a thermal diffusion plant could be fed into Y-12. Groves set up a committee consisting of Warren K. Lewis, Eger Murphree and Richard Tolman to investigate the idea, and they estimated that a thermal diffusion plant costing $3.5 million could enrich  of uranium per week to nearly 0.9% uranium-235. Groves approved its construction on 24 June 1944.

Groves contracted with the H. K. Ferguson Company of Cleveland, Ohio, to build the thermal diffusion plant, which was designated S-50. Groves's advisers, Karl Cohen and W. I. Thompson from Standard Oil, estimated that it would take six months to build. Groves gave Ferguson just four. Plans called for the installation of 2,142  diffusion columns arranged in 21 racks. Inside each column were three concentric tubes. The uranium hexafluoride flowed in the middle copper pipe, and isotope separation of the uranium occurred between the nickel and copper pipes.

Work commenced on 9 July 1944, and S-50 began partial operation in September. Ferguson operated the plant through a subsidiary known as Fercleve. The plant produced just  of 0.852% uranium-235 in October. Leaks limited production and forced shutdowns over the next few months, but in June 1945 it produced . By March 1945, all 21 production racks were operating. Initially the output of S-50 was fed into Y-12, but starting in March 1945 all three enrichment processes were run in series. S-50 became the first stage, enriching from 0.71% to 0.89%. This material was fed into the gaseous diffusion process in the K-25 plant, which produced a product enriched to about 23%. This was, in turn, fed into Y-12, which boosted it to about 89%, sufficient for nuclear weapons.

Aggregate U-235 production 
About  of uranium enriched to 89% uranium-235 was delivered to Los Alamos by July 1945. The entire 50 kg, along with some 50%-enriched, averaging out to about 85% enriched, were used in Little Boy.

Plutonium 
The second line of development pursued by the Manhattan Project used the fissile element plutonium. Although small amounts of plutonium exist in nature, the best way to obtain large quantities of the element is in a nuclear reactor, in which natural uranium is bombarded by neutrons. The uranium-238 is transmuted into uranium-239, which rapidly decays, first into neptunium-239 and then into plutonium-239. Only a small amount of the uranium-238 will be transformed, so the plutonium must be chemically separated from the remaining uranium, from any initial impurities, and from fission products.

X-10 Graphite Reactor 

In March 1943, DuPont began construction of a plutonium plant on a  site at Oak Ridge. Intended as a pilot plant for the larger production facilities at Hanford, it included the air-cooled X-10 Graphite Reactor, a chemical separation plant, and support facilities. Because of the subsequent decision to construct water-cooled reactors at Hanford, only the chemical separation plant operated as a true pilot.

The greatest difficulty was encountered with the uranium slugs produced by Mallinckrodt and Metal Hydrides. These somehow had to be coated in aluminum to avoid corrosion and the escape of fission products into the cooling system. The Grasselli Chemical Company attempted to develop a hot dipping process without success. Meanwhile, Alcoa tried canning. A new process for flux-less welding was developed, and 97% of the cans passed a standard vacuum test, but high temperature tests indicated a failure rate of more than 50%. Nonetheless, production began in June 1943. The Metallurgical Laboratory eventually developed an improved welding technique with the help of General Electric, which was incorporated into the production process in October 1943.

Modifications over time raised the power to 4,000 kW in July 1944. X-10 operated as a production plant until January 1945, when it was turned over to research activities.

Hanford reactors 

Although an air-cooled design was chosen for the reactor at Oak Ridge to facilitate rapid construction, it was recognized that this would be impractical for the much larger production reactors. Initial designs by the Metallurgical Laboratory and DuPont used helium for cooling, before they determined that a water-cooled reactor would be simpler, cheaper and quicker to build. The design did not become available until 4 October 1943; in the meantime, Matthias concentrated on improving the Hanford Site by erecting accommodations, improving the roads, building a railway switch line, and upgrading the electricity, water and telephone lines.

As at Oak Ridge, the most difficulty was encountered while canning the uranium slugs, which commenced at Hanford in March 1944. They were pickled to remove dirt and impurities, dipped in molten bronze, tin, and aluminum-silicon alloy, canned using hydraulic presses, and then capped using arc welding under an argon atmosphere. Finally, they were subjected to a series of tests to detect holes or faulty welds. Disappointingly, most canned slugs initially failed the tests, resulting in an output of only a handful of canned slugs per day. But steady progress was made and by June 1944 production increased to the point where it appeared that enough canned slugs would be available to start Reactor B on schedule in August 1944.

Work began on Reactor B, the first of six planned 250 MW reactors, on 10 October 1943. The reactor complexes were given letter designations A through F, with B, D and F sites chosen to be developed first, as this maximised the distance between the reactors. They would be the only ones constructed during the Manhattan Project.

Construction of the reactor itself commenced in February 1944. Watched by Compton, Matthias, DuPont's Crawford Greenewalt, Leona Woods and Fermi, who inserted the first slug, the reactor was powered up beginning on 13 September 1944. Over the next few days, 838 tubes were loaded and the reactor went critical. Shortly after midnight on 27 September, the operators began to withdraw the control rods to initiate production. At first all appeared well but around 03:00 the power level started to drop and by 06:30 the reactor had shut down completely. The cooling water was investigated to see if there was a leak or contamination. The next day the reactor started up again, only to shut down once more.

Fermi contacted Chien-Shiung Wu, who identified the cause of the problem as neutron poisoning from xenon-135, which has a half-life of 9.2 hours. Fermi, Woods, Donald J. Hughes and John Archibald Wheeler then calculated the nuclear cross section of xenon-135, which turned out to be 30,000 times that of uranium. DuPont engineer George Graves had deviated from the Metallurgical Laboratory's original design in which the reactor had 1,500 tubes arranged in a circle, and had added an additional 504 tubes to fill in the corners. The scientists had originally considered this overengineering a waste of time and money, but Fermi realized that by loading all 2,004 tubes, the reactor could reach the required power level and efficiently produce plutonium. Reactor D was started on 17 December 1944 and Reactor F on 25 February 1945.

Separation process 

Meanwhile, the chemists considered the problem of how plutonium could be separated from uranium when its chemical properties were not known. Working with the minute quantities of plutonium available at the Metallurgical Laboratory in 1942, a team under Charles M. Cooper developed a lanthanum fluoride process for separating uranium and plutonium, which was chosen for the pilot separation plant. A second separation process, the bismuth phosphate process, was subsequently developed by Seaborg and Stanly G. Thomson. This process worked by toggling plutonium between its +4 and +6 oxidation states in solutions of bismuth phosphate. In the former state, the plutonium was precipitated; in the latter, it stayed in solution and the other products were precipitated.

Greenewalt favored the bismuth phosphate process due to the corrosive nature of lanthanum fluoride, and it was selected for the Hanford separation plants. Once X-10 began producing plutonium, the pilot separation plant was put to the test. The first batch was processed at 40% efficiency but over the next few months this was raised to 90%.

At Hanford, top priority was initially given to the installations in the 300 area. This contained buildings for testing materials, preparing uranium, and assembling and calibrating instrumentation. One of the buildings housed the canning equipment for the uranium slugs, while another contained a small test reactor. Notwithstanding the high priority allocated to it, work on the 300 area fell behind schedule due to the unique and complex nature of the 300 area facilities, and wartime shortages of labor and materials.

Early plans called for the construction of two separation plants in each of the areas known as 200-West and 200-East. This was subsequently reduced to two, the T and U plants, in 200-West and one, the B plant, at 200-East. Each separation plant consisted of four buildings: a process cell building or "canyon" (known as 221), a concentration building (224), a purification building (231) and a magazine store (213). Each consisted of forty  cells.

Work began on 221-T and 221-U in January 1944, with the former completed in September and the latter in December. The 221-B building followed in March 1945. Because of the high levels of radioactivity involved, all work in the separation plants had to be conducted by remote control using closed-circuit television, something unheard of in 1943. Maintenance was carried out with the aid of an overhead crane and specially designed tools. The 224 buildings were smaller because they had less material to process, and it was less radioactive. The 224-T and 224-U buildings were completed on 8 October 1944, and 224-B followed on 10 February 1945. The purification methods that were eventually used in 231-W were still unknown when construction commenced on 8 April 1944, but the plant was complete and the methods were selected by the end of the year. On 5 February 1945, Matthias hand-delivered the first shipment of 80 g of 95%-pure plutonium nitrate to a Los Alamos courier in Los Angeles.

Weapon design 

In 1943, development efforts were directed to a gun-type fission weapon with plutonium called Thin Man. Initial research on the properties of plutonium was done using cyclotron-generated plutonium-239, which was extremely pure, but could only be created in very small amounts. Los Alamos received the first sample of plutonium from the Clinton X-10 reactor in April 1944 and within days Emilio Segrè discovered a problem: the reactor-bred plutonium had a higher concentration of plutonium-240, resulting in up to five times the spontaneous fission rate of cyclotron plutonium. Seaborg had correctly predicted in March 1943 that some of the plutonium-239 would absorb a neutron and become plutonium-240.

This made reactor plutonium unsuitable for use in a gun-type weapon. The plutonium-240 would start the chain reaction too quickly, causing a predetonation that would release enough energy to disperse the critical mass with a minimal amount of plutonium reacted (a fizzle). A faster gun was suggested but found to be impractical. The possibility of separating the isotopes was considered and rejected, as plutonium-240 is even harder to separate from plutonium-239 than uranium-235 from uranium-238.

Work on an alternative method of bomb design, known as implosion, had begun earlier under the direction of the physicist Seth Neddermeyer. Implosion used explosives to crush a subcritical sphere of fissile material into a smaller and denser form. When the fissile atoms are packed closer together, the rate of neutron capture increases, and the mass becomes a critical mass. The metal needs to travel only a very short distance, so the critical mass is assembled in much less time than it would take with the gun method. Neddermeyer's 1943 and early 1944 investigations into implosion showed promise, but also made it clear that the problem would be much more difficult from a theoretical and engineering perspective than the gun design. In September 1943, John von Neumann, who had experience with shaped charges used in armor-piercing shells, argued that not only would implosion reduce the danger of predetonation and fizzle, but would make more efficient use of the fissionable material. He proposed using a spherical configuration instead of the cylindrical one that Neddermeyer was working on.

By July 1944, Oppenheimer had concluded plutonium could not be used in a gun design, and opted for implosion. The accelerated effort on an implosion design, codenamed Fat Man, began in August 1944 when Oppenheimer implemented a sweeping reorganization of the Los Alamos laboratory to focus on implosion. Two new groups were created at Los Alamos to develop the implosion weapon, X (for explosives) Division headed by explosives expert George Kistiakowsky and G (for gadget) Division under Robert Bacher. The new design that von Neumann and T (for theoretical) Division, most notably Rudolf Peierls, had devised used explosive lenses to focus the explosion onto a spherical shape using a combination of both slow and fast high explosives.

The design of lenses that detonated with the proper shape and velocity turned out to be slow, difficult and frustrating. Various explosives were tested before settling on composition B as the fast explosive and baratol as the slow explosive. Getting the detonation just right required fast, reliable and safe electrical detonators, of which there were two for each lens for reliability. It was therefore decided to use exploding-bridgewire detonators, a new invention developed at Los Alamos by a group led by Luis Alvarez. A contract for their manufacture was given to Raytheon.

To study the behavior of converging shock waves, Robert Serber devised the RaLa Experiment, which used the short-lived radioisotope lanthanum-140, a potent source of gamma radiation. The gamma ray source was placed in the center of a metal sphere surrounded by the explosive lenses, which in turn were inside in an ionization chamber. This allowed the taking of an X-ray movie of the implosion. The lenses were designed primarily using this series of tests. In his history of the Los Alamos project, David Hawkins wrote: "RaLa became the most important single experiment affecting the final bomb design".

Its main job was to hold the critical mass together as long as possible, but it would also reflect neutrons back into the core. Some part of it might fission as well. To prevent predetonation by an external neutron, the tamper was coated in a thin layer of boron. A polonium-beryllium modulated neutron initiator, known as an "urchin" because its shape resembled a sea urchin, was developed to start the chain reaction at precisely the right moment. This work with the chemistry and metallurgy of radioactive polonium was directed by Charles Allen Thomas of the Monsanto Company and became known as the Dayton Project. Testing required up to 500 curies per month of polonium, which Monsanto was able to deliver. The whole assembly was encased in a duralumin bomb casing to protect it from bullets and flak.

The ultimate task of the metallurgists was to determine how to cast plutonium into a sphere. The difficulties became apparent when attempts to measure the density of plutonium gave inconsistent results. At first contamination was believed to be the cause, but it was soon determined that there were multiple allotropes of plutonium. The brittle α phase that exists at room temperature changes to the plastic β phase at higher temperatures. Attention then shifted to the even more malleable δ phase that normally exists in the 300 °C to 450 °C range. It was found that this was stable at room temperature when alloyed with aluminum, but aluminum emits neutrons when bombarded with alpha particles, which would exacerbate the pre-ignition problem. The metallurgists then hit upon a plutonium-gallium alloy, which stabilized the δ phase and could be hot pressed into the desired spherical shape. As plutonium was found to corrode readily, the sphere was coated with nickel.

The work proved dangerous. By the end of the war, half the experienced chemists and metallurgists had to be removed from work with plutonium when unacceptably high levels of the element appeared in their urine. A minor fire at Los Alamos in January 1945 led to a fear that a fire in the plutonium laboratory might contaminate the whole town, and Groves authorized the construction of a new facility for plutonium chemistry and metallurgy, which became known as the DP-site. The hemispheres for the first plutonium pit (or core) were produced and delivered on 2 July 1945. Three more hemispheres followed on 23 July and were delivered three days later.

Trinity 

Because of the complexity of an implosion-style weapon, it was decided that, despite the waste of fissile material, an initial test would be required. Groves approved the test, subject to the active material being recovered. Consideration was therefore given to a controlled fizzle, but Oppenheimer opted instead for a full-scale nuclear test, codenamed "Trinity".

In March 1944, planning for the test was assigned to Kenneth Bainbridge, a professor of physics at Harvard, working under Kistiakowsky. Bainbridge selected the bombing range near Alamogordo Army Airfield as the site for the test. Bainbridge worked with Captain Samuel P. Davalos on the construction of the Trinity Base Camp and its facilities, which included barracks, warehouses, workshops, an explosive magazine and a commissary.

Groves did not relish the prospect of explaining to a Senate committee the loss of a billion dollars worth of plutonium, so a cylindrical containment vessel codenamed "Jumbo" was constructed to recover the active material in the event of a failure. Brought in a special railroad car to a siding in Pope, New Mexico, it was transported the last  to the test site on a trailer pulled by two tractors. By the time it arrived, however, confidence in the implosion method was high enough, and the availability of plutonium was sufficient, that Oppenheimer decided not to use it. Instead, it was placed atop a steel tower  from the weapon as a rough measure of how powerful the explosion would be. In the end, Jumbo survived, although its tower did not, adding credence to the belief that Jumbo would have successfully contained a fizzled explosion.

A pre-test explosion was conducted on 7 May 1945 to calibrate the instruments. This explosion was observed by Oppenheimer and Groves's new deputy commander, Brigadier General Thomas Farrell. The pre-test produced data that proved vital for the Trinity test.

For the actual test, the weapon, nicknamed "the gadget", was hoisted to the top of a  steel tower, as detonation at that height would give a better indication of how the weapon would behave when dropped from a bomber. Detonation in the air maximized the energy applied directly to the target, and generated less nuclear fallout. The gadget was assembled under the supervision of Norris Bradbury at the nearby McDonald Ranch House on 13 July, and precariously winched up the tower the following day. Observers included Bush, Chadwick, Conant, Farrell, Fermi, Groves, Lawrence, Oppenheimer and Tolman. It was heard as far away as El Paso, Texas, so Groves issued a cover story about an ammunition magazine explosion at Alamogordo Field.

Oppenheimer later recalled that, while witnessing the explosion, he thought of a verse from the Hindu holy book, the Bhagavad Gita (XI,12):

 Years later he would explain that another verse had also entered his head at that time:

Personnel 
In June 1944, the Manhattan Project employed some 129,000 workers, of whom 84,500 were construction workers, 40,500 were plant operators and 1,800 were military personnel. As construction activity fell off, the workforce declined to 100,000 a year later, but the number of military personnel increased to 5,600. Procuring the required numbers of workers, especially highly skilled workers, in competition with other vital wartime programs proved very difficult. In 1943, Groves obtained a special temporary priority for labor from the War Manpower Commission. In March 1944, both the War Production Board and the War Manpower Commission gave the project their highest priority. The Kansas commission director stated that from April to July 1944 every qualified applicant in the state who visited a United States Employment Service office was urged to work at the Hanford Site. No other job was offered until the applicant definitively rejected the offer.

Tolman and Conant, in their role as the project's scientific advisers, drew up a list of candidate scientists and had them rated by scientists already working on the project. Groves then sent a personal letter to the head of their university or company asking for them to be released for essential war work. At the University of Wisconsin–Madison, Stanislaw Ulam gave one of his students, Joan Hinton, an exam early, so she could leave to do war work. A few weeks later, Ulam received a letter from Hans Bethe, inviting him to join the project. Conant personally persuaded Kistiakowsky to join the project.

One source of skilled personnel was the Army itself, particularly the Army Specialized Training Program. In 1943, the MED created the Special Engineer Detachment (SED), with an authorized strength of 675. Technicians and skilled workers drafted into the Army were assigned to the SED. Another source was the Women's Army Corps (WAC). Initially intended for clerical tasks handling classified material, the WACs were soon tapped for technical and scientific tasks as well. On 1 February 1945, all military personnel assigned to the MED, including all SED detachments, were assigned to the 9812th Technical Service Unit, except at Los Alamos, where military personnel other than SED, including the WACs and Military Police, were assigned to the 4817th Service Command Unit.

An Associate Professor of Radiology at the University of Rochester School of Medicine, Stafford L. Warren, was commissioned as a colonel in the United States Army Medical Corps, and appointed as chief of the MED's Medical Section and Groves' medical advisor. Warren's initial task was to staff hospitals at Oak Ridge, Richland and Los Alamos. The Medical Section was responsible for medical research, but also for the MED's health and safety programs. This presented an enormous challenge, because workers were handling a variety of toxic chemicals, using hazardous liquids and gases under high pressures, working with high voltages, and performing experiments involving explosives, not to mention the largely unknown dangers presented by radioactivity and handling fissile materials. Yet in December 1945, the National Safety Council presented the Manhattan Project with the Award of Honor for Distinguished Service to Safety in recognition of its safety record. Between January 1943 and June 1945, there were 62 fatalities and 3,879 disabling injuries, which was about 62 percent below the rate of private industry.

Secrecy 

Byron Price, head of the government's Office of Censorship, called the Manhattan Project the best-kept secret of the war. A 1945 Life article estimated that before the Hiroshima and Nagasaki bombings "probably no more than a few dozen men in the entire country knew the full meaning of the Manhattan Project, and perhaps only a thousand others even were aware that work on atoms was involved." The magazine wrote that the more than 100,000 others employed with the project "worked like moles in the dark".

In December 1945 the United States Army published a secret report analysing and assessing the security apparatus surrounding the Manhattan Project. The report states that the Manhattan Project was "more drastically guarded than any other highly secret war development." The security infrastructure surrounding the Manhattan Project was so vast and thorough that in the early days of the project in 1943, security investigators vetted 400,000 potential employees and 600 companies that would be involved in all aspects of the project for potential security risks. Although at times the most important employer in the nation for government bureaucrats assigning manpower, they only knew of the "Pasco secret project"; one said that until Hiroshima "we had no idea what was being made".

Oak Ridge security personnel considered any private party with more than seven people as suspicious, and residents—who believed that US government agents were secretly among them—avoided repeatedly inviting the same guests. Although original residents of the area could be buried in existing cemeteries, every coffin was reportedly opened for inspection. Everyone, including top military officials, and their automobiles were searched when entering and exiting project facilities. One Oak Ridge worker stated that "if you got inquisitive, you were called on the carpet within two hours by government secret agents. Usually those summoned to explain were then escorted bag and baggage to the gate and ordered to keep going".

Despite being told that their work would help end the war and perhaps all future wars, not seeing or understanding the results of their often tedious duties—or even typical side effects of factory work such as smoke from smokestacks—and the war in Europe ending without the use of their work, caused serious morale problems among workers and caused many rumors to spread. One manager stated after the war:

Another worker told of how, working in a laundry, she every day held "a special instrument" to uniforms and listened for "a clicking noise". She learned only after the war that she had been performing the important task of checking for radiation with a geiger counter. To improve morale among such workers Oak Ridge created an extensive system of intramural sports leagues, including 10 baseball teams, 81 softball teams, and 26 football teams.

Censorship 

Voluntary censorship of atomic information began before the Manhattan Project. After the start of the European war in 1939 American scientists began avoiding publishing military-related research, and in 1940 scientific journals began asking the National Academy of Sciences to clear articles. William L. Laurence of The New York Times, who wrote an article on atomic fission in The Saturday Evening Post of 7 September 1940, later learned that government officials asked librarians nationwide in 1943 to withdraw the issue. The Soviets noticed the silence, however. In April 1942 nuclear physicist Georgy Flyorov wrote to Josef Stalin on the absence of articles on nuclear fission in American journals; this resulted in the Soviet Union establishing its own atomic bomb project.

The Manhattan Project operated under tight security lest its discovery induce Axis powers, especially Germany, to accelerate their own nuclear projects or undertake covert operations against the project. The Office of Censorship, by contrast, relied on the press to comply with a voluntary code of conduct it published, and the project at first avoided notifying the office. By early 1943 newspapers began publishing reports of large construction in Tennessee and Washington based on public records, and the office began discussing with the project how to maintain secrecy. In June the Office of Censorship asked newspapers and broadcasters to avoid discussing "atom smashing, atomic energy, atomic fission, atomic splitting, or any of their equivalents. The use for military purposes of radium or radioactive materials, heavy water, high voltage discharge equipment, cyclotrons." The office also asked to avoid discussion of "polonium, uranium, ytterbium, hafnium, protactinium, radium, rhenium, thorium, deuterium"; only uranium was sensitive, but was listed with other elements to hide its importance.

Soviet spies 

The prospect of sabotage was always present, and sometimes suspected when there were equipment failures. While there were some problems believed to be the result of careless or disgruntled employees, there were no confirmed instances of Axis-instigated sabotage. However, on 10 March 1945, a Japanese fire balloon struck a power line, and the resulting power surge caused the three reactors at Hanford to be temporarily shut down. With so many people involved, security was a difficult task. A special Counter Intelligence Corps detachment was formed to handle the project's security issues. By 1943, it was clear that the Soviet Union was attempting to penetrate the project. Lieutenant Colonel Boris T. Pash, the head of the Counter Intelligence Branch of the Western Defense Command, investigated suspected Soviet espionage at the Radiation Laboratory in Berkeley. Oppenheimer informed Pash that he had been approached by a fellow professor at Berkeley, Haakon Chevalier, about passing information to the Soviet Union.

The most successful Soviet spy was Klaus Fuchs, a member of the British Mission who played an important part at Los Alamos. The 1950 revelation of his espionage activities damaged the United States' nuclear cooperation with Britain and Canada. Subsequently, other instances of espionage were uncovered, leading to the arrest of Harry Gold, David Greenglass, and Julius and Ethel Rosenberg. Other spies like George Koval and Theodore Hall remained unknown for decades. The value of the espionage is difficult to quantify, as the principal constraint on the Soviet atomic bomb project was a shortage of uranium ore. The consensus is that espionage saved the Soviets one or two years of effort.

Foreign intelligence 

In addition to developing the atomic bomb, the Manhattan Project was charged with gathering intelligence on the German nuclear energy project. It was believed that the Japanese nuclear weapons program was not far advanced because Japan had little access to uranium ore, but it was initially feared that Germany was very close to developing its own weapons. At the instigation of the Manhattan Project, a bombing and sabotage campaign was carried out against heavy water plants in German-occupied Norway. A small mission was created, jointly staffed by the Office of Naval Intelligence, OSRD, the Manhattan Project, and Army Intelligence (G-2), to investigate enemy scientific developments. It was not restricted to those involving nuclear weapons. The Chief of Army Intelligence, Major General George V. Strong, appointed Boris Pash to command the unit, which was codenamed "Alsos", a Greek word meaning "grove".

The Alsos Mission to Italy questioned staff of the physics laboratory at the University of Rome following the capture of the city in June 1944. Meanwhile, Pash formed a combined British and American Alsos mission in London under the command of Captain Horace K. Calvert to participate in Operation Overlord. Groves considered the risk that the Germans might attempt to disrupt the Normandy landings with radioactive poisons was sufficient to warn General Dwight D. Eisenhower and send an officer to brief his chief of staff, Lieutenant General Walter Bedell Smith. Under the codename Operation Peppermint, special equipment was prepared and Chemical Warfare Service teams were trained in its use.

Following in the wake of the advancing Allied armies, Pash and Calvert interviewed Frédéric Joliot-Curie about the activities of German scientists. They spoke to officials at Union Minière du Haut Katanga about uranium shipments to Germany. They tracked down 68 tons of ore in Belgium and 30 tons in France. The interrogation of German prisoners indicated that uranium and thorium were being processed in Oranienburg, 20 miles north of Berlin, so Groves arranged for it to be bombed on 15 March 1945.

An Alsos team went to Stassfurt in the Soviet Occupation Zone and retrieved 11 tons of ore from WIFO. In April 1945, Pash, in command of a composite force known as T-Force, conducted Operation Harborage, a sweep behind enemy lines of the cities of Hechingen, Bisingen, and Haigerloch that were the heart of the German nuclear effort. T-Force captured the nuclear laboratories, documents, equipment and supplies, including heavy water and 1.5 tons of metallic uranium.

Alsos teams rounded up German scientists including Kurt Diebner, Otto Hahn, Walther Gerlach, Werner Heisenberg, and Carl Friedrich von Weizsäcker, who were taken to England where they were interned at Farm Hall, a bugged house in Godmanchester. After the bombs were detonated in Japan, the Germans were forced to confront the fact that the Allies had done what they could not.

Atomic bombings of Hiroshima and Nagasaki

Preparations 

Starting in November 1943, the Army Air Forces Materiel Command at Wright Field, Ohio, began Silverplate, the codename modification of B-29s to carry the bombs. Test drops were carried out at Muroc Army Air Field, California, and the Naval Ordnance Test Station at Inyokern, California. Groves met with the Chief of United States Army Air Forces (USAAF), General Henry H. Arnold, in March 1944 to discuss the delivery of the finished bombs to their targets. Groves hoped that the American Boeing B-29 Superfortress could be modified to carry Thin Man by joining its two bomb bays together. Arnold promised that no effort would be spared to modify B-29s to do the job, and designated Major General Oliver P. Echols as the USAAF liaison to the Manhattan Project. In turn, Echols named Colonel Roscoe C. Wilson as his alternate, and Wilson became Manhattan Project's main USAAF contact. President Roosevelt instructed Groves that if the atomic bombs were ready before the war with Germany ended, he should be ready to drop them on Germany.

The 509th Composite Group was activated on 17 December 1944 at Wendover Army Air Field, Utah, under the command of Colonel Paul W. Tibbets. This base, close to the border with Nevada, was codenamed "Kingman" or "W-47". Training was conducted at Wendover and at Batista Army Airfield, Cuba, where the 393d Bombardment Squadron practiced long-distance flights over water, and dropping dummy pumpkin bombs. A special unit known as Project Alberta was formed at Los Alamos under Navy Captain William S. Parsons from Project Y as part of the Manhattan Project to assist in preparing and delivering the bombs. Commander Frederick L. Ashworth from Alberta met with Fleet Admiral Chester W. Nimitz on Guam in February 1945 to inform him of the project. While he was there, Ashworth selected North Field on the Pacific Island Tinian as a base for the 509th Composite Group, and reserved space for the group and its buildings. The group deployed there in July 1945. Farrell arrived at Tinian on 30 July as the Manhattan Project representative.

Most of the components for Little Boy left San Francisco on the cruiser  on 16 July and arrived on Tinian on 26 July. Four days later the ship was sunk by a Japanese submarine. The remaining components, which included six uranium-235 rings, were delivered by three C-54 Skymasters of the 509th Group's 320th Troop Carrier Squadron. Two Fat Man assemblies travelled to Tinian in specially modified 509th Composite Group B-29s. The first plutonium core went in a special C-54. In late April, a joint targeting committee of the Manhattan District and USAAF was established to determine which cities in Japan should be targets, and recommended Kokura, Hiroshima, Niigata, and Kyoto. At this point, Secretary of War Henry L. Stimson intervened, announcing that he would be making the targeting decision, and that he would not authorize the bombing of Kyoto on the grounds of its historical and religious significance. Groves therefore asked Arnold to remove Kyoto not just from the list of nuclear targets, but from targets for conventional bombing as well. One of Kyoto's substitutes was Nagasaki.

Bombings 
In May 1945, the Interim Committee was created to advise on wartime and postwar use of nuclear energy. The committee was chaired by Stimson, with James F. Byrnes, a former US Senator soon to be Secretary of State, as President Harry S. Truman's personal representative; Ralph A. Bard, the Under Secretary of the Navy; William L. Clayton, the Assistant Secretary of State; Vannevar Bush; Karl T. Compton; James B. Conant; and George L. Harrison, an assistant to Stimson and president of New York Life Insurance Company. The Interim Committee in turn established a scientific panel consisting of Arthur Compton, Fermi, Lawrence and Oppenheimer to advise it on scientific issues. In its presentation to the Interim Committee, the scientific panel offered its opinion not just on the likely physical effects of an atomic bomb, but on its probable military and political impact.

At the Potsdam Conference in Germany, Truman was informed that the Trinity test had been successful. He told Stalin, the leader of the Soviet Union, that the US had a new superweapon, without giving any details. This was the first official communication to the Soviet Union about the bomb, but Stalin already knew about it from spies. With the authorization to use the bomb against Japan already given, no alternatives were considered after the Japanese rejection of the Potsdam Declaration.

On 6 August 1945, a Boeing B-29 Superfortress (Enola Gay) of the 393d Bombardment Squadron, piloted by Tibbets, lifted off from North Field with a Little Boy in its bomb bay. Hiroshima, the headquarters of the 2nd General Army and Fifth Division and a port of embarkation, was the primary target of the mission, with Kokura and Nagasaki as alternatives. With Farrell's permission, Parsons, the weaponeer in charge of the mission, completed the bomb assembly in the air to minimize the risks of a nuclear explosion in the event of a crash during takeoff. Japanese officials determined that 69% of Hiroshima's buildings were destroyed and another 6–7% damaged. About 70,000 to 80,000 people, of whom 20,000 were Japanese combatants and 20,000 were Korean slave laborers, or some 30% of the population of Hiroshima, were killed immediately, and another 70,000 injured.

On the morning of 9 August 1945, a second B-29 (Bockscar), piloted by the 393d Bombardment Squadron's commander, Major Charles W. Sweeney, lifted off with a Fat Man on board. This time, Ashworth served as weaponeer and Kokura was the primary target. Sweeney took off with the weapon already armed but with the electrical safety plugs still engaged. When they reached Kokura, they found cloud cover had obscured the city, prohibiting the visual attack required by orders. After three runs over the city, and with fuel running low, they headed for the secondary target, Nagasaki. Ashworth decided that a radar approach would be used if the target was obscured, but a last-minute break in the clouds over Nagasaki allowed a visual approach as ordered. The Fat Man was dropped over the city's industrial valley midway between the Mitsubishi Steel and Arms Works in the south and the Mitsubishi-Urakami Ordnance Works in the north. The resulting explosion had a blast yield equivalent to 21 kilotons of TNT, roughly the same as the Trinity blast, but was confined to the Urakami Valley, and a major portion of the city was protected by the intervening hills, resulting in the destruction of about 44% of the city. The bombing also crippled the city's industrial production extensively and killed 23,200–28,200 Japanese industrial workers and 150 Japanese soldiers. Overall, an estimated 35,000–40,000 people were killed and 60,000 injured.

Groves expected to have another atomic bomb ready for use on 19 August, with three more in September and a further three in October. Two more Fat Man assemblies were readied, and scheduled to leave Kirtland Field for Tinian on 11 and 14 August. At Los Alamos, technicians worked 24 hours straight to cast another plutonium core. Although cast, it still needed to be pressed and coated, which would take until 16 August. It could therefore have been ready for use on 19 August. On 10 August, Truman secretly requested that additional atomic bombs not be dropped on Japan without his express authority. Groves suspended the third core's shipment on his own authority on 13 August.

On 11 August, Groves phoned Warren with orders to organize a survey team to report on the damage and radioactivity at Hiroshima and Nagasaki. A party equipped with portable Geiger counters arrived in Hiroshima on 8 September headed by Farrell and Warren, with Japanese Rear Admiral Masao Tsuzuki, who acted as a translator. They remained in Hiroshima until 14 September and then surveyed Nagasaki from 19 September to 8 October. This and other scientific missions to Japan provided valuable scientific and historical data.

The necessity of the bombings of Hiroshima and Nagasaki became a subject of controversy among historians. Some questioned whether an "atomic diplomacy" would not have attained the same goals and disputed whether the bombings or the Soviet declaration of war on Japan was decisive. The Franck Report was the most notable effort pushing for a demonstration but was turned down by the Interim Committee's scientific panel. The Szilárd petition, drafted in July 1945 and signed by dozens of scientists working on the Manhattan Project, was a late attempt at warning President Harry S. Truman about his responsibility in using such weapons.

After the war 

Seeing the work they had not understood produce the Hiroshima and Nagasaki bombs amazed the workers of the Manhattan Project as much as the rest of the world; newspapers in Oak Ridge announcing the Hiroshima bomb sold for $1 ($ today). Although the bombs' existence was public, secrecy continued, and many workers remained ignorant of their jobs; one stated in 1946, "I don't know what the hell I'm doing besides looking into a ——— and turning a ——— alongside a ———. I don't know anything about it, and there's nothing to say". Many residents continued to avoid discussion of "the stuff" in ordinary conversation despite it being the reason for their town's existence.

In anticipation of the bombings, Groves had Henry DeWolf Smyth prepare a history for public consumption. Atomic Energy for Military Purposes, better known as the "Smyth Report", was released to the public on 12 August 1945. Groves and Nichols presented Army–Navy "E" Awards to key contractors, whose involvement had hitherto been secret. Over 20 awards of the Presidential Medal for Merit were made to key contractors and scientists, including Bush and Oppenheimer. Military personnel received the Legion of Merit, including the commander of the Women's Army Corps detachment, Captain Arlene G. Scheidenhelm.

At Hanford, plutonium production fell off as Reactors B, D and F wore out, poisoned by fission products and swelling of the graphite moderator known as the Wigner effect. The swelling damaged the charging tubes where the uranium was irradiated to produce plutonium, rendering them unusable. In order to maintain the supply of polonium for the urchin initiators, production was curtailed and the oldest unit, B pile, was closed down so at least one reactor would be available in the future. Research continued, with DuPont and the Metallurgical Laboratory developing a redox solvent extraction process as an alternative plutonium extraction technique to the bismuth phosphate process, which left unspent uranium in a state from which it could not easily be recovered.

Bomb engineering was carried out by the Z Division, named for its director, Dr. Jerrold R. Zacharias from Los Alamos. Z Division was initially located at Wendover Field but moved to Oxnard Field, New Mexico, in September 1945 to be closer to Los Alamos. This marked the beginning of Sandia Base. Nearby Kirtland Field was used as a B-29 base for aircraft compatibility and drop tests. By October, all the staff and facilities at Wendover had been transferred to Sandia. As reservist officers were demobilized, they were replaced by about fifty hand-picked regular officers.

Nichols recommended that S-50 and the Alpha tracks at Y-12 be closed down. This was done in September. Although performing better than ever, the Alpha tracks could not compete with K-25 and the new K-27, which had commenced operation in January 1946. In December, the Y-12 plant was closed, thereby cutting the Tennessee Eastman payroll from 8,600 to 1,500 and saving $2 million a month.

Nowhere was demobilization more of a problem than at Los Alamos, where there was an exodus of talent. Much remained to be done. The bombs used on Hiroshima and Nagasaki were like laboratory pieces; work would be required to make them simpler, safer and more reliable. Implosion methods needed to be developed for uranium in place of the wasteful gun method, and composite uranium-plutonium cores were needed now that plutonium was in short supply because of the problems with the reactors. However, uncertainty about the future of the laboratory made it hard to induce people to stay. Oppenheimer returned to his job at the University of California and Groves appointed Norris Bradbury as an interim replacement; Bradbury remained in the post for the next 25 years. Groves attempted to combat the dissatisfaction caused by the lack of amenities with a construction program that included an improved water supply, three hundred houses, and recreation facilities.

Two Fat Man-type detonations were conducted at Bikini Atoll in July 1946 as part of Operation Crossroads to investigate the effect of nuclear weapons on warships. Able was detonated on 1 July 1946. The more spectacular Baker was detonated underwater on 25 July 1946.

After the bombings at Hiroshima and Nagasaki, a number of Manhattan Project physicists founded the Bulletin of the Atomic Scientists, which began as an emergency action undertaken by scientists who saw urgent need for an immediate educational program about atomic weapons. In the face of the destructiveness of the new weapons and in anticipation of the nuclear arms race several project members including Bohr, Bush and Conant expressed the view that it was necessary to reach agreement on international control of nuclear research and atomic weapons. The Baruch Plan, unveiled in a speech to the newly formed United Nations Atomic Energy Commission (UNAEC) in June 1946, proposed the establishment of an international atomic development authority, but was not adopted.

Following a domestic debate over the permanent management of the nuclear program, the United States Atomic Energy Commission (AEC) was created by the Atomic Energy Act of 1946 to take over the functions and assets of the Manhattan Project. It established civilian control over atomic development, and separated the development, production and control of atomic weapons from the military. Military aspects were taken over by the Armed Forces Special Weapons Project (AFSWP). Although the Manhattan Project ceased to exist on 31 December 1946, the Manhattan District was not abolished until 15 August 1947.

Cost 

The project expenditure through 1 October 1945 was $1.845 billion, equivalent to less than nine days of wartime spending, and was $2.191 billion when the AEC assumed control on 1 January 1947. Total allocation was $2.4 billion. Over 90% of the cost was for building plants and producing the fissionable materials, and less than 10% for development and production of the weapons.

A total of four weapons (the Trinity gadget, Little Boy, Fat Man, and an unused Fat Man bomb) were produced by the end of 1945, making the average cost per bomb around $500 million in 1945 dollars. By comparison, the project's total cost by the end of 1945 was about 90% of the total spent on the production of US small arms (not including ammunition) and 34% of the total spent on US tanks during the same period. Overall, it was the second most expensive weapons project undertaken by the United States in World War II, behind only the design and production of the Boeing B-29 Superfortress.

Legacy 

The political and cultural impacts of the development of nuclear weapons were profound and far-reaching. William Laurence of The New York Times, the first to use the phrase "Atomic Age", became the official correspondent for the Manhattan Project in spring 1945. In 1943 and 1944 he unsuccessfully attempted to persuade the Office of Censorship to permit writing about the explosive potential of uranium, and government officials felt that he had earned the right to report on the biggest secret of the war. Laurence witnessed both the Trinity test and the bombing of Nagasaki and wrote the official press releases prepared for them. He went on to write a series of articles extolling the virtues of the new weapon. His reporting before and after the bombings helped to spur public awareness of the potential of nuclear technology and motivated its development in the United States and the Soviet Union.

The wartime Manhattan Project left a legacy in the form of the network of national laboratories: the Lawrence Berkeley National Laboratory, Los Alamos National Laboratory, Oak Ridge National Laboratory, Argonne National Laboratory, and Ames Laboratory. Two more were established by Groves soon after the war, the Brookhaven National Laboratory at Upton, New York, and the Sandia National Laboratories at Albuquerque, New Mexico. Groves allocated $72 million to them for research activities in fiscal year 1946–1947. They would be in the vanguard of the kind of large-scale research that Alvin Weinberg, the director of the Oak Ridge National Laboratory, would call Big Science.

The Naval Research Laboratory had long been interested in the prospect of using nuclear power for warship propulsion, and sought to create its own nuclear project. In May 1946, Nimitz, now Chief of Naval Operations, decided that the Navy should instead work with the Manhattan Project. A group of naval officers were assigned to Oak Ridge, the most senior of whom was Captain Hyman G. Rickover, who became assistant director there. They immersed themselves in the study of nuclear energy, laying the foundations for a nuclear-powered navy. A similar group of Air Force personnel arrived at Oak Ridge in September 1946 with the aim of developing nuclear aircraft. Their Nuclear Energy for the Propulsion of Aircraft (NEPA) project ran into formidable technical difficulties, and was ultimately cancelled.

The ability of the new reactors to create radioactive isotopes in previously unheard-of quantities sparked a revolution in nuclear medicine in the immediate postwar years. Starting in mid-1946, Oak Ridge began distributing radioisotopes to hospitals and universities. Most of the orders were for iodine-131 and phosphorus-32, which were used in the diagnosis and treatment of cancer. In addition to medicine, isotopes were also used in biological, industrial and agricultural research.

On handing over control to the Atomic Energy Commission, Groves bid farewell to the people who had worked on the Manhattan Project:

In 2014, the United States Congress passed a law providing for a national park dedicated to the history of the Manhattan Project. The Manhattan Project National Historical Park was established on 10 November 2015.

Notes

Explanatory footnotes

Citations

General and cited references

General, administrative, and diplomatic histories 

 
 
 
 
 
 
 
 
 
 
 
 
 
 
 
 
 
 
 Lindorff, Dave, "Brothers Against the Bureau: Ted Hall, the Soviet Union's youngest atomic spy, his rocket scientist brother Ed, and the untold story of how J. Edgar Hoover's biggest Manhattan Project bust was shut down", The Nation, vol. 314, no. 1 (10–17 January 2022), pp. 26–31. Published online as "One Brother Gave the Soviets the A-Bomb. The Other Got a Medal."

Technical histories 

 
 
  (1967 interview with Groves)
 
 
 
 
 
 
 
 
 
  (Available on Wikimedia Commons)

Participant accounts

External links 

 
 
  Features hundreds of audio/visual interviews with Manhattan Project veterans.
 
 
 Manhattan Project and Allied Scientists Collections at the University of Chicago Special Collections Research Center

 
1942 establishments in the United States
1946 disestablishments in the United States
American secret government programs
Atomic bombings of Hiroshima and Nagasaki
Explosives engineering
History of the Manhattan Project
Military history of Canada during World War II
Military history of the United Kingdom during World War II
Military history of the United States during World War II
Nuclear history of the United States
Nuclear weapons program of the United States
Projects established in 1942
Secret military programs